The 2002 Tropicana 400 was the 18th stock car race of the 2002 NASCAR Winston Cup Series and the second iteration of the event. The race was held on Sunday, July 14, 2002, in Joliet, Illinois, at Chicagoland Speedway, a 1.5 miles (2.41 km) tri-oval speedway. The race took the scheduled 267 laps to complete. At race's end, Kevin Harvick, driving for Richard Childress Racing, would stretch out a fuel run and climb through the field to win his third career NASCAR Winston Cup Series win and his first and only win of the season. To fill out the podium, Jeff Gordon of Hendrick Motorsports and Tony Stewart of Joe Gibbs Racing would finish second and third, respectively.

Background 

Chicagoland Speedway is a 1.5 miles (2.41 km) tri-oval speedway in Joliet, Illinois, southwest of Chicago. The speedway opened in 2001 and currently hosts NASCAR racing. Until 2011, the speedway also hosted the IndyCar Series, recording numerous close finishes including the closest finish in IndyCar history. The speedway is owned and operated by International Speedway Corporation and located adjacent to Route 66 Raceway.

Entry list 

 (R) denotes rookie driver.

Practice

First practice 
The first practice session was held on Friday, July 12, at 11:20 AM CST, and would last for 2 hours.

Second practice 
The second practice session was held on Saturday, July 13, at 10:15 AM CST, and would last for 45 minutes.

Third and final practice 
The third and final practice session, sometimes referred to as Happy Hour, was held on Saturday, July 13, at 11:15 AM CST, and would last for 45 minutes.

Qualifying 
Qualifying was held on Friday, July 12, at 3:05 PM CST. Each driver would have two laps to set a fastest time; the fastest of the two would count as their official qualifying lap. Positions 1-36 would be decided on time, while positions 37-43 would be based on provisionals. Six spots are awarded by the use of provisionals based on owner's points. The seventh is awarded to a past champion who has not otherwise qualified for the race. If no past champ needs the provisional, the next team in the owner points will be awarded a provisional.

Four drivers would fail to qualify: Ron Hornaday Jr., Kirk Shelmerdine, Tony Raines, and Scott Wimmer.

Full qualifying results

Race results

References 

2002 NASCAR Winston Cup Series
NASCAR races at Chicagoland Speedway
July 2002 sports events in the United States
2002 in sports in Illinois